Litocampa is a genus of two-pronged bristletails in the family Campodeidae. There are at least 20 described species in Litocampa.

Species
These 22 species belong to the genus Litocampa:

 Litocampa bourgoini (Condé, 1948) g
 Litocampa cognata (Condé, 1948) g
 Litocampa coiffaiti (Condé, 1948) g
 Litocampa condei Ferguson, 1999 i c g
 Litocampa cookei (Packard, 1871) i c g
 Litocampa drescoi (Condé, 1949) g
 Litocampa enriqueriojai Sendra & Garcia g
 Litocampa espanoli (Condé, 1949) g
 Litocampa fieldingi (Conde, 1949) i c g
 Litocampa henroti (Conde, 1949) i c g
 Litocampa henryi Condé, 1991 g
 Litocampa hubarti Bareth, 1999 g
 Litocampa humilis (Condé, 1948) g
 Litocampa jonesi (Conde, 1949) i c g
 Litocampa nearctica Silvestri, 1934 i c g
 Litocampa paclti Conde, 1981 g
 Litocampa perkinsi (Silvestri, 1934) i c g
 Litocampa pucketti Conde and Bareth, 1996 i c g
 Litocampa quadrisetigera Bareth, 2001 g
 Litocampa sollaudi (Denis, 1930) g
 Litocampa tuzetae (Condé, 1948) g
 Litocampa valentinei (Conde, 1949) i c g

Data sources: i = ITIS, c = Catalogue of Life, g = GBIF, b = Bugguide.net

References

Further reading

 
 
 

Diplura